Joseph Wilfrid Isae Rodrigue Lorrain (July 26, 1914 – October 22, 1980) was a professional ice hockey player who played 179 games in the National Hockey League. Born in Buckingham, Quebec, he played for the Montreal Canadiens.

External links

1914 births
1980 deaths
Canadian ice hockey right wingers
Ice hockey people from Gatineau
Montreal Canadiens players